Basal readers are textbooks used to teach reading and associated skills to schoolchildren.  Commonly called "reading books" or "readers" they are usually published as anthologies that combine previously published short stories, excerpts of longer narratives, and original works.  A standard basal series comes with individual identical books for students, a Teacher's Edition of the book, and a collection of workbooks, assessments, and activities.

Description
Basal readers are typically organized. Stories are chosen to illustrate and develop specific skills, which are taught in a pre-determined sequence. The teacher's editions are also tightly organized, containing much more than the answer key to the questions that usually appear at the end of each reading passage. The teacher's book also contains suggestions for pre-reading and post-reading activities and assessments, as well as scripted questions to ask students at specific points in a story.

History

Basal readers have been in use in the United States since the mid-1860s, beginning with a series called the McGuffey Readers.  This was the first reader published with the idea of having one text for each grade level.  Since then, teaching methodologies in school basals have shifted regularly.  The Scott Foresman Company published what is perhaps the most famous basal series, whose stories starred two children named Dick and Jane.  Dick and Jane books emphasized memorizing words on sight, a method which came to be known as "look and say".  This philosophy came under attack in the late 1950s, largely due to Rudolf Flesch's book Why Johnny Can't Read.  This was a scathing condemnation of the "look say" method, and advocated a return to programs that stressed teaching phonics to beginning readers.

During the 1970s and early 1980s, the pendulum did swing back toward a more phonics-based approach.  During the latter part of the 1980s, basal usage declined as reading programs began to turn to whole language programs that relied more heavily on trade books, rather than textbooks.  The 1990s and early years of the 21st century have seen a renewed interest in skills acquisition which has sparked a resurgence in basal dominance.

Benefits
The highly planned nature of basal readers is seen as one of their strengths, as this eases the load on teachers, particularly those who are inexperienced.  Specific skills can be easily targeted, tested, and remediated.  Those with very controlled vocabulary usage may ease difficulties for beginner or weak readers.  Students who are reading below grade level will receive some benefits from using the on-level basal. The exposure will prepare them for state testing. Using a basal reader as a starting point for grade level reading allows educators to quickly assess student reading level.  Basals are not meant to be the only resource a student uses, just the starting point.

See also

Authors
 Joy Cowley
 Kate Harrington
Types
 Anthology
 Primer
 Graded readers
 Alphabet book
Education
 Extensive reading
 Phonics
 Reading education
 Whole language
Examples
 Alice and Jerry
 Dick and Jane
 Janet and John
 Peter and Jane
 Spot the Dog
 McGuffey Readers
 The New England Primer
 Al-Qiraa Al-Khaldouniya
 Alfubei Nwe

References

External links

Free graded readers for learners of English
Oxford University Press Japan Graded Readers, Oxford University Press

 
Learning to read
cs:Slabikář
de:Lesebuch
pl:Elementarz
szl:Ślabikoř